Joseph Albert Seabury was an American sea captain and shipwright known for a high volume of vessels produced in the mid-to-late 19th century during the peak years of shipbuilding in North Yarmouth, Maine (today's Yarmouth).

Career
In the 1840s, Seabury was a sea captain. In 1843, he was in charge of the brig Zoroaster, which was built in Thomaston, Maine, with fellow Mainers Nathaniel Robbins, of Fairfield, and Moses Tolman, of Industry.

Seabury worked with his father, Joseph Sr., at the J. & A. Seabury yards on the eastern side of the Royal River in Yarmouth.

Seabury Jr. also worked at Blanchard Brothers shipyard, which was established in 1857 by former sea captain Sylvanus Blanchard and three of his sons, Paul, Sylvanus Cushing and Perez.

Selected vessels
Seabury was responsible for the following selected ships:

Detroit (1855)
Abbie C. Titcomb (1863)
Admiral
S. C. Blanchard
Pacific
Star
Casco Lodge (1867)
Commodore (1879)

References

Date of birth missing
Date of death missing
People from North Yarmouth, Maine
Sea captains
American shipwrights